Yves Durand (14 April 1932 – April 2004) was a French historian, professor of modern history at the Sorbonne.

He was a member of the Club de l'horloge.

References

Carrefour de l'horloge people
1932 births
2004 deaths
Academic staff of the University of Paris
20th-century French historians
Knights of the Ordre national du Mérite
Officiers of the Légion d'honneur
Winners of the Prix Broquette-Gonin (literature)